Woodlawn High School (commonly Woodlawn or WHS) is a public high school in Old Jefferson, a census-designated place in unincorporated East Baton Rouge Parish, Louisiana, United States, in the Baton Rouge metropolitan area. It is operated by the East Baton Rouge Parish School District.

It serves the southeast Baton Rouge area's public school needs for grades 9–12 and its 2006 enrollment was 1095 students.

It is in the proposed City of St. George.

Communities served
Woodlawn serves various census-designated places (CDP) in the parish: all of Old Jefferson, the Village St. George, most of Shenandoah, a northeast section of Oak Hills Place, and small eastern portions of Inniswold.

Curriculum
Woodlawn requires that students register for a schedule of 7 classes per day. They offer a mix of courses and credits to prepare students for college or vocational training.  Woodlawn started a self-contained gifted and talented program in 2009. The school offers honors classes in English, Mathematics, Science, and Social Studies as well as advanced placement courses in calculus, US History, European History, World History, Psychology, Spanish, French, Studio Art, English, Biology, Chemistry, Physics, Human Geography and US Government.

Dual enrollment and concurrent enrollment with Baton Rouge Community College and Louisiana State University are also offered at Woodlawn. Students must be approved by the principal as well as meet the strict qualifications to be eligible to enroll. Both high school and college credits are awarded for students enrolled in these classes.

Woodlawn in cooperation with the United States Army also offers JROTC courses. The focus for the education is on leadership but also includes training in map reading, marksmanship, drill, and more. Woodlawn even boasts an indoor firing range for marksmanship practice with .177 caliber air rifles.

Academics
During the 2011 - 2012 academic year, Woodlawn received a C rating on Louisiana's performance label index with a Baseline School Performance Score (SPS) of 101.5. The school has increased from its 2010-2011 performance score by 14.6 points, achieving its annual growth goal.  Woodlawn's SPS score has increased each year from the 2008 - 2009 academic year. The school had an SPS of 81.1 for the 2008 - 2009 year, an SPS of 84.6 for the 2009 - 2010 year, 89.9 for the 2010 - 2011 year, and a 101.5 for the 2011 - 2012 year.

The school has an on-time graduation percentage of 72% exceeding both the district and state averages of 66.4% and 64.8% respectively. Woodlawn's integrated Louisiana Education Assessment Program (iLEAP) and Graduation Exit Exam (GEE) scores are slightly lower than state averages and slightly higher than district averages.
Woodlawn also scores slightly lower than district, state, and national averages on American College Testing (ACT) scores (Composite: 19.3, English: 18.9, Math: 18.7, Reading: 19.2, Science: 19.7).

Of the teachers at Woodlawn who are instructing students in English, math, science, social studies, foreign language, and the high school arts 94% meet the No Child Left Behind Act's Highly Qualified definition.

Campus
Woodlawn's original campus was on Tiger Bend Road in Baton Rouge. The original school house and its accompanying buildings were unknowingly constructed on top of the Baton Rouge fault line and as a result the buildings were continuously moving. In 1996 the band and choir halls as well as the auditorium were condemned and classes were no longer permitted to take place in them as a result of structural movement.

Due largely in part to its age and location on the fault line and consequently as a result of the dilapidated buildings and approval by the tax payers, a new Woodlawn High School was constructed a few short miles away on a  site. The new school opened its doors in 2003 and became the first new school to open in the parish in 30 years. As a result of the construction of a new school, the site of the original school was razed in 2004. The former location, although moved on the property, is now home to Woodlawn Middle School.

Extracurricular activities

Clubs
Woodlawn has many clubs and extra curricular activities some of which meet as regular classes. The following is an abbreviated list:
 Art Club
 Band
 Beta Club
 Choir
 Fellowship of Christian Athletes
 Flag Corps
 JROTC
 Mu Alpha Theta (Math Club)
 National Honor Society
 Panthrobotics (FIRST Robotics Competition)
 Yearbook
 Thespian Society/Drama Club

Athletics
Woodlawn competes in Louisiana High School Athletics Association's (LHSAA) District 7 Class 4A. The athletics department is currently led by Athletic Director Elmo Fernandez.

The school competes in Football, Basketball, Volleyball, Baseball, Softball, Soccer, Track, Swimming, Bowling, and Golf.

Championships
The 2002–2003 boys basketball team garnered national attention after winning back-to-back state championships. Coach Kenny Almond led the team to a #2 ranking in USA Today's national high school poll. The team was runner up to the St. Vincent-St.Mary's squad led by youth star LeBron James. Before the 2002-2003 boys basketball team, there were the teams of 1991-1992 and 1992–1993. The team of 1991-1992 had a record of 33–1, while the 1992-1993 team lost in the state championship on two missed free throws at the end of the game with no time left on the clock. These teams were also coached by Kenny Almond.  Almond led the team to a total of three state championships, in 1999, 2002, and 2003, as well as two state runner-up finishes.

The boys soccer team won the state championship in 1991.

Football
The football program was a constant playoff performer in the 1980s-2000s. The 1989 team compiled a record of 11-3 and a semi-final appearance.

Notable alumni
 Chad Durbin - MLB pitcher for Philadelphia Phillies.
 Darnell Lazare - Professional basketball player
 Danielle Scott-Arruda - Four time U.S. indoor volleyball Olympian.
 Brett Blackledge - 2007 Pulitzer Prize winner
 Toni Graphia - TV writer/producer, Peabody Award winner
 Donovan Wilson - NFL football safety, Dallas Cowboys (Texas A&M alumni)

Notes

External links
 Woodlawn High School
 

Public high schools in Louisiana
Schools in East Baton Rouge Parish, Louisiana